Karina Buhr (born 20 May 1974), is a Brazilian singer-songwriter, actress and percussionist.

Biography
Born in Salvador, Buhr grew up in Recife, where she started collaborating as a percussionist with several traditional maracatu groups. In 1997 she co-founded the band Comadre Florzinha, serving as singer, composer, multi-instrumentalist and album cover illustrator. In 2011 she released her second album Longe de Onde and took part to several festivals, including Rock in Rio and Roskilde Festival. Both her first two albums were included in the list of the best albums of the year published by Rolling Stone Brasil. She was nominated at the MTV Video Music Brazil for best female artist, best album and best song. In 2014 she held a European tour, performing in Paris, Berlin, Madrid, Barcelona, Porto and Lisbon. In 2015 she released her third album, Selvática, and held a national tour. In 2018 she reunited with Comadre Florzinha members Alessandra Leão and  Isaar França for a series of shows. In 2019 she released the album Desmanche, also serving as co-producer with Regis Damasceno.

Buhr won the award for best soundtrack at the 45th Brasília Film Festival for the Marcelo Gomes's film Once Upon a Time Was I, Verônica. As an actress, she took part to several stage plays with the Teatro Oficina company in São Paulo. Also a writer, in 2015 she published a collection of poems entitled Desperdiçando Rima.

Discography 
Eu meti pra você (2010)
 Longe de Onde (2011)
 Selvática (2015)
Desmanche (2019)

References

External links
 
 

1974 births
Living people
People from Salvador, Bahia
Brazilian singer-songwriters
Brazilian stage actresses
Brazilian film actresses
21st-century Brazilian singers
21st-century Brazilian women singers
Women in Latin music